The 1981 NSL Cup was the fifth season of the NSL Cup, which was the main national association football knockout cup competition in Australia. All 16 NSL teams from around Australia entered the competition, as well as a further 20 from various state leagues around Australia.

Bracket

Preliminary rounds

First round

Round of 16

Quarter-finals

Semi-finals

Final

References

NSL Cup
1981 in Australian soccer
NSL Cup seasons